Dactylocladus is a monotypic genus of trees in the family Crypteroniaceae. It contains the single species Dactylocladus stenostachys. The generic name means "finger twigs", referring to the branching of the twigs. The specific epithet stenostachys means "small spike", referring to the inflorescence.

Description
Its bark is brown to grey initially, turning reddish brown and scaly in the mature tree. The timber is used for flooring and furniture.

Distribution and habitat
Dactylocladus stenostachys is endemic to Borneo. Its habitat is in peat swamp forest, occasionally in kerangas forest.

References

Crypteroniaceae
Monotypic Myrtales genera
Endemic flora of Borneo